KMEA may refer to:

 KMEA-LP, a low-power radio station (92.7 FM) licensed to Bozeman, Montana, United States
 Kentucky Music Educators Association